Børge-Are Halvorsen (born 12 October 1978 in Lillehammer, Norway) is a Norwegian Jazz musician (soprano, alto, tenor and baritone saxophone and c- and alto flute). His family moved to Sandane in Gloppen where he spent his youth, but he was later a freelance musician resident of Oslo since 2003.

Career 
Halvorsen studied music at Firda vidaregåande skule (1994–97), then at "Viken Folkehøgskole" (1997–98) and at last on the Department of Music, Rhythmic studies at Universitetet i Agder (1998-02). Since 2006 he has been engaged as Lecturer in saxophone and jazz improvisation at Norges Musikkhøgskole, since 2010 also at Department of Musicology Universitetet i Oslo. He also works as an arranger, much in connection with horn section or big band.

Halvorsen plays with "Ensemble Denada", "Examination of What", Ole Børud, "Ekvilibrium", "Vinni", "Penthouse Playboys", "Hans Orkester", "Steffen Isaksens Orkester", "KABA Orchestra" and "Jon Haaland Big Band". Has also appeared in the bands Paperboys, Dance with a Stranger, Karpe Diem, Sharp Nine, "Smiths Venner", Jens Wendelboe Crazy Energy Orchestra, "Mathilde Grooss Viddal/FriEnsemblet", Kjell Karlsens Orkester, "Bjørn W W Jørgensen Storband", Chipahua, The New Swing Generation, "The Fabulous Couldhavebeens", "The New Jordal Swingers", "Soulslave", The Sinatra Songbook, "Soul, Inc.", "Soul Insurance" and "Earplay", and is also musical director of the Big Band "Bjørvika Business Band" since 2010.

Musicals / show (in selection) 
Halvorsen has participated on the following productions:

2003–05: Hjertelig hilsen Hege og Kjersti, Dizzie /norgesturné
2004: 80-tallet Beat for Bit, Edderkoppen
2005: The Show, Edderkoppen/Oseberg Kulturhus
2006: Laides' Night, Edderkoppen
2006: En kveld med Thomas og Harald... og Yngvar, norgesturné
2006: It's Showtime, Chat Noir/Drammen Teater/Oseberg Kulturhus
2007–08: Showgirls, Chat Noir/Sandefjord
2007: Svindlere med stil, Chateau Neuf
2008: Grease, Oslo Spektrum
2008: Singin' In The Rain, Oslo Nye
2009: Vår Jul (Cecilia Vennersten/Christian Ingebrigtsen), norgesturné
2009: Cats, Chat Noir, Oslo
2009: Les Misérables, Oslo Nye
2010: Swingin' Home For Christmas (Alexander Rybak), norgesturné
2010: Kåre, Linn, men Christian Skolmen, Chat Noir
2010: Spellemenn, Klubben, Tønsberg
2011: Øivind Blunck – Rett og slett, Dizzie 
2011: Ungen, Sandvika Teater
2012: Spamalot, Folketeateret, Oslo

Television productions (in selection) 
Halvorsen has contributed musically to the following productions:

 UMOJA – The Cultural Flying Carpet (African Broadcasting Union)
 UMOJA – The Cultural Flying Carpet (NRK)
 Først og sist med Skavlan (NRK)
 Sommeråpent (NRK) 
 Grosvold (NRK) 
 Store Studio (NRK)
 Memo (NRK)
 God Morgen, Norge (TV2) 
 Senkveld (TV2)
 Idrettsgallaen (NRK)
 Skal Vi Danse (TV2)
 Artistgallaen (TV2)
 TV-aksjonen (NRK)
 17. mai-konsert fra Rådhusplassen (TV2) 
 UNICEFs Lattergalla (TVNorge) 
 Gullfisken (TV2) 
 X-Factor (TV2)
 Idol (TV2)
 Erobreren (NRK) 
 Kvelden er din (TV2)
 Torsdag kveld fra Nydalen (TV2)
 Allsang på Grensen (TV2)
 Momarkedet (NRK/TV2)
 Komiprisen (NRK)
 Nobel Peace Prize Concert (NRK)
 Lilyhammer (NRK)
 Bye & Rønning (NRK)
 Asbjørn Brekke Show (TVNorge)

Discography (in selection) 
Halvorsen has contributed to the following releases:
 2004: Soria Moria, with Nissa Nyberget & Elisabeth Lindland, nominated for the 2004 children music Spellemannprisen
 2004: Falkner Street, with Number Seven Deli
 2004: Bigbandblast!, with Børre Dalhaug, nominated for the 2004 jazz Spellemannprisen
 2005: God Dag, with Kåre Conradi
 2005: Love Will Haunt You Down, with The Margarets
 2005: Birdie Blues, with Hilde Louise Asbjørnsen
 2005: Closer, with Beady Belle
 2006: Denada, Norske Store Orkester/Helge Sunde, nominated for the 2006 jazz Spellemannprisen
 2006: When Worlds Collide, with Paperboys
 2006: Matsukaze, with Håkon Storm
 2006: Big Band, with EvenEven
 2006: Seconds, with Number Seven Deli
 2007: Hjerteknuser, with Jan Eggum, nominated for the 2007 male artist Spellemannprisen
 2007: Sudoku, with Sharp Nine, nominated for the 2007 jazz Spellemannprisen
 2007: It's Beginning To Look A Lot Like Christmas, with Marian Aas Hansen
 2007: Catfish Row, with Ornand Altenburg
 2007: While I Walk You Home, with Dylan Mondegreen
 2007: Antonsen Big Band, with Antonsen Big Band
 2007: Eg veit i himmerik ei borg, with Jan Werner
 2008: Elske I Sneen, with Penthouse Playboys
 2008: Hold on Be Strong, with Maria Haukaas Storeng
 2008: True Colours, with Erlend Bratland, nominated for the 2008 newcomer Spellemannprisen
 2008: Shakin' The Ground, with Ole Børud
 2008: Twenty Years Erased, with The Margarets
 2008: Pappa, ikke gå så fort..., with Axel Hellstenius 
 2008: Sidelengs, with Ole Dørje
 2008: Nikken, with Nicolay Leganger
 2009: Finding Nymo, with Ensemble Denada, awarded ECHO Preis for this Year's big band album, by German record company organisation
 2009: The Oslo Agreement, within Paperboys
 2009: Edvard Grieg In Jazz Mood, with Kjell Karlsen Big Band
 2009: Come Closer, with FriEnsemblet
 2009: Vagabond, with Vagabond
 2010: Spinning Wheel, with Swinglett
 2010: Dråpe, with Maria Mohn
 2010: Sweet Freedom, with Ingrid Kjosavik
 2010: Neste stasjon Grorud, with Finn Kalvik & Erik Fosnes Hansen
 2010: The Best of Me Is You, with Heine Totland (single)
 2011: Examination of What (Losen Records), with Håvard Fossum Børge-Are Halvorsen Qrt
 2011: Visa vid vindens ängar, with Alexander Rybak
 2011: Hope Is Happiness, with Hilde Dahl
 2011: Løvlands Allé, with Løvlands Allé
 2011: Rikki's Guns, with Rikke Normann
 2011: No More Than Necessary, with The Douglas Group
 2011: For Your Soul, with Jens Andreas Kleiven
 2011: Keep Movin''', with Ole Børud
 2011: Little Brother – Out of the Pit, with Rune Brodahl
 2012: Hølå, with Rune Berg
 2012: Dylan Mondegreen, with Dylan Mondegreen
 2012: La Guinéenne, with Mory Kante
 2012: Undergroove, with FriEnsemblet
 2013: 20 År Midt I Musikken - Hit'er & Favoritter - Live (Da Works), with Trine Rein	
 2014: Sources Of Inspiration (AMP Music & Records), with Anders Thorén Quartet - 
 2014: I Go To The Rock (TAMU), with Oslo Gospel Choir
 2015: Bass Detector (Ozella), with Jens Fossum
 2015: Molok (Kscope), with Gazpacho
 2015: Salsa Til Folket! (Grappa), with Hovedøen Social Club
 2017: The Musical Messiah (TAMU), with Oslo Gospel Choir
 2018: I Am Awake'', with John Faxe

References

External links 
 Ballade.no: Børge-Are Halvorsen – Saksofonist

Norwegian jazz saxophonists
Norwegian jazz composers
1978 births
Living people
Musicians from Oslo
Losen Records artists
21st-century saxophonists
Ensemble Denada members